Bagher Hashemi is an Iranian football defender who plays for Esteghlal Khuzestan in the Persian Gulf Pro League.

Club career
Rabbani started his career with Esteghlal Khuzestan from youth levels. He promoted to the first team in summer 2014 while he signed a 3-year contract. He made his debut for Esteghlal Khuzestan on August 15, 2014, against Naft Tehran as a starter.

Club career statistics

Honours 
Esteghlal Khuzestan
Iran Pro League (1): 2015–16
Iranian Super Cup runner-up: 2016

References

External links
 Bagher Hashemi at IranLeague.ir

1994 births
Living people
Iranian footballers
Esteghlal Khuzestan players
People from Ahvaz
Association football defenders
Sportspeople from Khuzestan province